is a port and major shipbuilding city situated on the Seto Inland Sea in Hiroshima Prefecture, Japan. With a strong industrial and naval heritage, Kure hosts the second-oldest naval dockyard in Japan and remains an important base for the Japan Maritime Self-Defence Force (JMSDF) named, JMSDF Kure Naval Base. , the city has an estimated population of 228,030 and a population density of 646 persons per km2. The total area is 352.80 km2.

History 

The Kure Naval District was first established in 1889, leading to the construction of the Kure Naval Arsenal and the rapid growth of steel production and shipbuilding in the city. Kure was formally incorporated on October 1, 1902. From 1889 until the end of World War II, the city served as the headquarters of the Kure Naval District.

During the Pacific War, Kure acted as the Imperial Japanese Navy's single-largest naval base and arsenal. Most of the city's industry and workforce were employed in the service of the naval installations, munitions factories and associated support functions. In the later stages of the conflict Kure came under sustained aerial bombardment culminating in the Bombing of Kure in June and July 1945.

From February 1946 until the end of Japan's postwar occupation in 1952, military establishments in Kure served at the operational headquarters for the British Commonwealth Occupation Force.

Since 2005, Kure has attracted attention as a tourism center with the Yamato Museum hosting a 1:10 scale model of the Yamato alongside a waterfront JMSDF museum of Japanese naval history.

The city continues as a major maritime center hosting both the dockyards of Japan Marine United and numerous shore-based facilities of the JMSDF including training centers and a major hospital. The city serves as the home port of an Escort Flotilla (Destroyers), a Submarine Flotilla and the Training Squadron of the JMSDF Regional Kure District.

Historic timeline
July 1, 1889 — Kure Naval District established.
1895 — Kure naval shipyard established, initially as a subsidiary of the Onohama Shipyards in Kobe.
October 1, 1902 — The towns of Washō and Futagawa and the villages of Miyahara and Sōyamada merge to form the city of Kure.
November 10, 1903 — Kure Naval Arsenal established.
December 27, 1903 Kure rail line opens providing direct rail access to Hiroshima
April 1, 1928 — The towns of Kegoya, Yoshiura, and Aga merge into Kure.
April 21, 1941 — The town of Nigata and the village of Hiro incorporated into Kure.
March 19, 1945 — US Navy aircraft attack Japanese warships at Kure
May 5, 1945 — Bombing of Hiro Naval Arsenal.
June 22, 1945 — Bombing of Kure Naval Arsenal.
July 1, 1945 — Kure Air Raid.
July 24–28, 1945 — Battle of Kure, American bombers attack the remaining fleet in Kure Naval Base.
July 1, 1954 — Japan Maritime Self Defense Forces founded.
October 1, 1956 — The town of Tennō and the village of Shōwa in Aki District, and the village of Gōhara in Kamo District merge into Kure.
November 1, 2000 — Kure becomes a Special City
April 1, 2003 — The town of Shimokamagari (from Aki District) was merged into Kure.
April 1, 2004 —The town of Kawajiri (from Toyota District) was merged into Kure.
March 20, 2005 — The towns of Ondo, Kurahashi and Kamagari (all from Aki District), and the towns of Yasuura, Toyohama and Yutaka (all from Toyota District) were merged into Kure.
April 1, 2016 — Kure officially became a Core city.

List of mayors of Kure (from 1903 to present)

Geography 
Surrounded by steep hillsides to the north, the two major commercial and industrial centers of the city are bisected by Mount Yasumi . The city is next to the Setonaikai National Park. As well as densely populated urban and industrial centers, the city also incorporates sparsely inhabited outlying islands such as Kurahashi, Shimo-kamagari and Kami-kamagari.

Climate
Kure has a humid subtropical climate (Köppen climate classification Cfa) with hot summers and cool winters. Precipitation is significant throughout the year and is heaviest in summer.

Transportation 

Kure is served by the Kure Line, operated by West Japan Railway Company (JR West). It leads to Hiroshima, which is a terminal station.

There has been a municipal bus since December 1, 1942. The Kure City Transportation Bureau (Kure City Bus) started using natural gas in 2002. There is a bus route run by Hiroshima Electric Railway, too. In addition, there is Bōyo Kisen, which operates the San'yō Bus and Setouchi Sankō which runs two bus enterprises.

National Route 31 spreads out from Kure to Kaita, but the distance of the road is short. National Route 185 is connected from Kure to Mihara. This road has a view of the Inland Sea. National Route 375 is a  road to be connected from Kure to Ōda, Shimane. U.S. forces can use this way for their ammunition transportation. National Route 487 spreads out from Kure to the city of Hiroshima. This road crosses the Ondo Bridge, and goes around Etajima.

Though they are independent roads, separate from National Routes, there are a series of access roads toward the archipelago of the city. The Akinada Islands series of bridges conclude at Shimokamagari island, Kamikamagari island, Toyoshima, Osakishimojima, Herashima, Nakanoshima at seven bridges. Toyoshima Bridge, concluding at Toyoshima regards traffic of a ship as Kamikamagari island, and is 50 m high from the surface of the sea.

Economy 
 Japan Marine United, formerly IHI Marine United, has a shipyard in the city
 Nisshin Steel
 Yodogawa Steel Works
 Mitsubishi Hitachi Power Systems
 Sailor Pen Company
 Disco Corporation has three manufacturing plants in Kure
 Mitutoyo
 Oji Paper Company

Education
 Japan Coast Guard Academy
 Kure University
 Goko Academy

Tourism

Museums
 Kure Municipal Museum of Art and Museum Avenue
 Irifuneyama Memorial Museum
 Sannose Gohonjin Art and Culture
 Rantokaku Art Museum
 Kurahashi-cho Nagato Museum of Shipbuilding History
 JMSDF Kure Museum (Displaying Yūshio-class submarine Akishio), nicknamed Iron Whale Museum
 Yamato Museum

Shrines
 Kameyama Shrine

Historical places
 Former Kure-chinjufu
 Mitarai
 Former House of Prince Takamatsu
 House of Kimiyo Fujii
 Takechimaru anti-invasion cement ships

Parks and gardens
 Rekishi-no-mieru-Oka and Park
 Nagasako Park
 Allay Karasu Kojima Park
 Ondono-seto and Park
 Setonaikai National Park
 Kure Port-pia Park
 Nikokyo Park

Mountains
 Mount Noro
 Haiga-mine
 Mount Yasumi
 Nikyu-kyo
 Honjo Suigenchi

Beaches
 Romantic Beach Karuga
 Kajigahama Beach

Festivals
 Kure Port Festival
 Kure Fireworks above the Sea (late July or early August)
 Kameyama Shrine Festival (2nd Sunday in October, and the day before)

Sister cities
, Kure has sister city agreements with the following cities.

Sister cities
 Bremerton, Washington, United States (since August 1970)
 Marbella, Andalusia, Spain (since December 1990)
 Jinhae-gu, Changwon, South Gyeongsang, South Korea (since October 1999)
 Keelung, Taiwan (since April 2017)

Friendship cities
 Daisen, Tottori (since September 1995)

Friendship ports
 Wenzhou, Zhejiang, People's Republic of China (since May 2001)

Notable people

Musicians
 Michiru Jo
 Miyu Matsuki
 Machico
 Akira Sakata
 Hitomi Shimatani

Authors
 Hiromu Ono
 Shinji Wada

Sports
 Fumio Fujimura
 Shinji Hamazaki
 Tatsuro Hirooka
 Ryō Hirakawa

Politicians 

 Rob Lucas

See also
Bombing of Kure (July 1945)
Kono Sekai no Katasumi ni

References

External links

  
 Kure City Travel and Event Guide
 

 
Cities in Hiroshima Prefecture
Port settlements in Japan
Populated coastal places in Japan